Solomon I the Great, (1735 – April 23, 1784), of the Bagrationi Dynasty, was King of Imereti (western Georgia) from 1752 to 1765 and again from 1767 until his death in 1784.

Solomon was a son of Alexander V of Imereti by his second wife Tamar née Abashidze and succeeded upon his father's death in 1752. He immediately launched a series of stringent measures against the renegade nobles and slave trade from which they profited in conjunction with the Ottoman authorities. In 1752, the aristocratic opposition staged a coup, but Solomon quickly regained the crown and began a program of reforms aimed at stabilizing the kingdom torn apart by chronic civil wars. The Ottomans, which saw Imereti as the sphere of their influence, sent in an army, but Solomon succeeded in mobilizing his nobles around him and defeated the invaders at the Battle of Khresili in 1757. The same year, he forged an alliance with his kinsman, Heraclius II, who ruled in eastern Georgia. He defeated two more Ottoman invasions (20,000 strong and 13,000 strong). The Ottoman instigated invasion of North Caucasus tribes, one of which succeeded, while second one was thwarted. Briefly, Ottomans took Kutaisi in 1765 and placed his cousin, Teimuraz on the throne. In 1767, Solomon managed to stage a comeback, and freed Imereti of Turks again. Next year, another Russo-Turkish war broke out, and in May 1769, Solomon traveled to Tbilisi to meet with Heraclius II. The two kings decided to request five Russian regiments and join the war with the Ottoman Empire in exchange of the guarantee that Georgian interests would be protected in the final Russo-Turkish peace deal. The Russians sent a small force under General Gottlieb Heinrich Totleben, but the general's rudeness and condescension alienated the Georgians; Totleben was quickly recalled from Georgia. After the war was over, Solomon was able to force his autonomist vassals, princes of Mingrelia and Guria, into submission, and continued antagonizing the Ottoman hegemony in the region. Ottomans had no choice but to sign a treaty with Imereti, by which Imereti was no longer Ottoman vassal, slave trade was not even mentioned, with symbolic tribute of 60 women annually (did not stipulate them to be Georgians, and Solomon never honored this clause anyway). He crushed the Ottoman-sponsored insurrection in Abkhazia in 1779, and made a series of forays into the Turkish-controlled southwestern historic Georgian lands. He died in March 1784 and was buried at the Gelati Monastery. He was canonized by the Georgian Orthodox Church on 22 December 2016, his feast day set for 23 April (NS 10 April). 

Solomon I was married three times; first, to Princess Tinatin Shervashidze, second to Princess Mariam, daughter of Otia Dadiani (died 1778), Prince of Mingrelia, and third, Princess Gulkan Tsulukidze (1730–1800). He had five children, three sons and two daughters:
Prince David, born of Solomon's first marriage to Tinatin Shervashidze. 
Prince Alexander (1760–1780), born by Mariam Dadiani. He led a revolt against Solomon in 1778.
Princess Darejan (ka) (1756–1827), born by Mariam Dadiani. She married, in 1768, Prince Kaikhosro Abashidze. Their son, Ivane Abashidze, was a pretender to the throne of Imereti in 1820.
Princess Mariam (1769–1845), born by Mariam Dadiani. She married Prince Elizbar Eristavi of Ksani (1738–1813).
Prince Bagrat, an extramarital son.

Ancestry

References

 სოლომონ I (Solomon I). People.Istoria.Ge. Accessed on September 23, 2007.

1735 births
1784 deaths
Bagrationi dynasty of the Kingdom of Imereti
Kings of Imereti
18th-century people from Georgia (country)
Eastern Orthodox monarchs
People of the Russo-Turkish War (1768–1774)